Pitcairnia riparia is a plant species in the genus Pitcairnia. This species is native to Bolivia and Ecuador.

References

riparia
Flora of Bolivia
Flora of Ecuador